The 2004 CAF Super Cup was the 12th CAF Super Cup, an annual football match organized by the Confederation of African Football (CAF), between the winners of the previous season's CAF Champions League and CAF Confederation Cup competitions. The match was contested by 2003 CAF Champions League winners, Enyimba, and 2003 African Cup Winners' Cup winners, ES Sahel, at the Aba Stadium in Aba, Nigeria, on 22 February 2004.

The game finished 1–0 to Enyimba, securing their first Super Cup title.

Teams

Match details

See also
2003 CAF Champions League
2003 African Cup Winners' Cup

References

Super
2004
Enyimba FC matches
Étoile Sportive du Sahel matches
2003–04 in Tunisian football
2003–04 in Nigerian football